The year 1914 in archaeology involved some significant events.

Explorations
 January - T. E. Lawrence and Leonard Woolley undertake an archaeological survey of the Negev.
 March 29 - Katherine Routledge and her husband William Scoresby Routledge arrive on Easter Island to make the first true study of it (departing August 1915).

Excavations
 Katherine Routledge commences excavation at key Easter Island sites including Rano Raraku and Orongo.
 George Herbert, 5th Earl of Carnarvon, and Howard Carter first excavate in the Valley of the Kings, Egypt.
 Hiram Bingham III resumes excavations around Machu Picchu in Peru.
 Excavations begin at Traprain Law in Scotland.
 Excavation of Tinkinswood Neolithic megalithic chamber tomb in South Wales.

Finds

Publications
 John L. Myres - Handbook of the Cesnola Collection of Antiquities from Cyprus (Metropolitan Museum of Art, New York).
 Thomas A. Joyce - Mexican Archaeology: an introduction to the archaeology of the Mexican and Mayan civilizations of pre-Spanish America.
 Egypt Exploration Fund begins publishing The Journal of Egyptian Archaeology.

Honours
 John Marshall knighted.

Births
 April 23 - Glyn Daniel, Welsh-born archaeologist (d. 1986).
 June 12 - William Lamplough, British archaeologist (d. 1996).
 June 14 - Rupert Bruce-Mitford, British archaeologist (d. 1994).
 June 5 - Beatrice De Cardi, British archaeologist of Asia (d. 2016).

Deaths
 March 18 - Adolph Francis Alphonse Bandelier, American archaeologist (b. 1840).
 May 18 - Edward R. Ayrton, English Egyptologist and archaeologist (b. 1882).

References

Archaeology
Archaeology
Archaeology by year